Aleksandr Maslov (born 25 December 1969) is a Russian football coach and a former player. He played as a striker for Russian, Spanish and Swiss professional clubs, most notably for FC Rostov.

Aleksandr Maslov started his player career in a Soviet Second League club Dynamo Makhachkala. In 1991, he moved to play for Nart Cherkessk, a club that was given a place in the 1992 Russian Second Division after the dissolution of USSR. In 1992, he debuted in the Russian Top Division with Dynamo Stavropol.

In the middle of 1993 season Maslov transferred to Rostselmash, another Top Division side. Rostselmash were relegated that season, and in 1994 Maslov scored 32 goals to help them win the promotion back. In 1996, he became the top scorer of the Russian Top Division, scoring 23 goals in 33 matches.

In 1998 Maslov moved to Spain to play for Albacete Balompié. His spell with the club was not successful, as he made only 8 appearances in the course of a year. In 1999-2001 Maslov played for various Swiss clubs.

In 2002, he returned to Rostov-on-Don to play for the renamed FC Rostov. After finishing his player career in 2004 he started working at Rostov as an assistant coach.

Maslov holds records for most goals scored for Rostov in the Russian league overall (90) and in one season (23).

External links 
 Club profile
 FC Rostov individual records

1969 births
Living people
Soviet footballers
Russian footballers
Russian expatriate footballers
Russian expatriate sportspeople in Spain
Russian expatriate sportspeople in Switzerland
Expatriate footballers in Spain
Expatriate footballers in Switzerland
La Liga players
FC Dynamo Stavropol players
FC Rostov players
Albacete Balompié players
Russian Premier League players
Neuchâtel Xamax FCS players
Swiss Super League players
FC Sion players
Russian football managers
Footballers from Makhachkala
Association football forwards
FC Dynamo Makhachkala players